Elections to the Supreme Soviet of the Estonian SSR were held on 16 February 1947. They were the first elections since the Estonian SSR was declared on 21 July 1940 and the first after World War II.

The elections took place on the same day as the elections to the Supreme Soviet of the Latvian SSR.

The Bloc of Communists and Non-Party Candidates was the only party able to contest the elections, and won all 100 seats. Elected members included Joseph Stalin (Tallinn constituency 9), Vyacheslav Molotov (Tallinn constituency 2) and Andrei Zhdanov (Kohtla-Järve constituency no 84).

Results

See also
List of members of the Supreme Soviet of the Estonian Soviet Socialist Republic, 1947–1951

References

Estonia
Single-candidate elections
One-party elections
1947 in Estonia
Parliamentary elections in Estonia
Estonian Soviet Socialist Republic